Brian Pinkerton is an American author of fiction in the suspense, thriller, mystery, science fiction and horror genres. He received his B.A. from the University of Iowa and Master's Degree from Northwestern University.

Select bibliography

Novels
 Abducted (Leisure Books, Dorchester Publishing, 2004; Crossroad Press, 2017)
 Vengeance (Leisure Books, Dorchester Publishing, 2005)
 Killer's Diary (King's Way Press, 2010; Samhain Publishing, 2013)
 Rough Cut (Bad Moon Books, 2011; Dark Arts Books, 2017)
 How I Started The Apocalypse (Severed Press, 2012; reissued with new cover art, 2015) – introduction by Hugh Howey
 How I Started The Apocalypse, Book Two: The Hunger War (Severed Press, 2013; reissued with new cover art, 2015)
 Bender (Crossroad Press, 2014)
 Anatomy of Evil (Samhain Publishing, 2015)
 How I Started The Apocalypse, Book Three: Zombie Regime (Severed Press, 2015)
 The Gemini Experiment (Flame Tree Publishing, 2019)
Time Warp - A Twisted Love Story (Crossroad Press, 2020)
 The Nirvana Effect (Flame Tree Publishing, 2021)

Short stories
 "Lower Wacker Blues" – appears in the anthology Chicago Blues (Bleak House Books, 2007)
 "SWAT" – appears in the anthology Zombie Zoology (Severed Press, 2010)
 "Now Look What You Did" – appears in the anthology PULP! 2013 Winter/Spring (Twit Publishing, 2013)
 "The Larson County Scare-O-Rama Show" – appears in The Horror Zine (November 2014)

Audio books
 Abducted – unabridged, narrated by Beth Richmond (Books in Motion, 2009)
 Vengeance – unabridged, narrated by Dave Courvoisier (Books in Motion, 2010)
 Killer's Diary – unabridged, narrated by Talmadge Ragan (Crossroad Press, 2017)
 Bender – unabridged, narrated by Chet Williamson (Crossroad Press, 2017)
 The Gemini Experiment – unabridged, narrated by Lance C. Fuller (Flame Tree Publishing, 2019)
Time Warp - A Twisted Love Story – unabridged, narrated by Joshua Saxon (Crossroad Press, 2020)

eBook editions
 Killing the Boss (MC Writing, 2011)
 Rough Cut (Crossroad Press, 2012; Evil Jester Press, 2013)
 How I Started The Apocalypse (Severed Press, 2012)
 Killer's Diary (Samhain Publishing, 2013; Crossroad Press, 2017)
 How I Started The Apocalypse, Book Two: The Hunger War (Severed Press, 2013)
 Bender (Crossroad Press, 2014)
 Abducted (Crossroad Press, 2015)
 Anatomy of Evil (Samhain Publishing, 2015; Crossroad Press, 2017)
 Vengeance (Crossroad Press, 2015)
 How I Started The Apocalypse, Book Three: Zombie Regime (Severed Press, 2015)
 The Gemini Experiment (Flame Tree Publishing, 2019)
 Time Warp - A Twisted Love Story (Crossroad Press, 2020)
 The Nirvana Effect (Flame Tree Publishing, 2021)

Foreign-language editions
 Vendetta – Bulgarian-language release of Vengeance (Kalpazanov Publishing, 2007)

Non-fiction
 "Screaming In My Ear" – appears in the collection Horror 201: The Silver Scream (Crystal Lake Publishing, 2015)

Self-published
 Killing the Boss (iUniverse, 2000)
 Unreleased (First Publish, 2002)
 The Ruts - cartoon strip collection (Lulu, 2013)

References and external links

Brian Pinkerton's Blog
Interview with Brian Pinkerton in Literary World (2008)
Interview with Brian Pinkerton on Macabre Ink (2008)
Interview with Brian Pinkerton by the Chicago Writers Association (2008)
The Ruts cartoon series by Brian Pinkerton

American thriller writers
Living people
University of Iowa alumni
American male novelists
21st-century American novelists
Northwestern University alumni
21st-century American male writers
Year of birth missing (living people)